= Soy Suspenso =

Mexican rock band

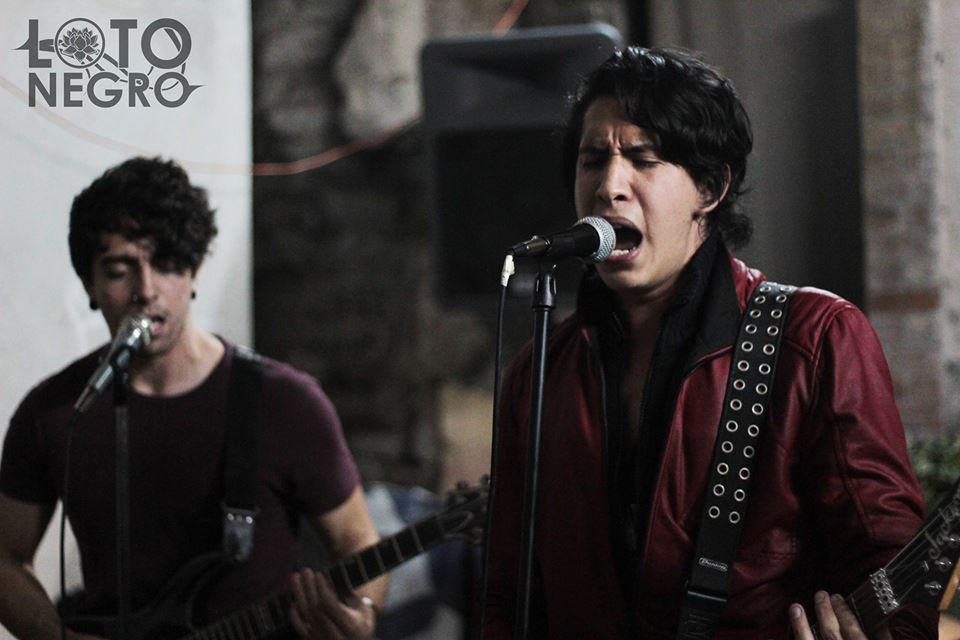

Soy Suspenso was a Mexican rock band from Aguascalientes,Mexico formed in 2012. They released three studio albums, several singles and one demo available through music streaming platforms.

== History ==
The band was formed in 2012 by Omar Montañez (Ace Midas) on vocals and Alex Medina on bass. They later recruited Pol Gómez on drums and Julio César Álvarez on lead guitar. Their debut album, Hotel Venganza, was released in 2012, with the band touring Mexico and sharing the stage with acts such as El Tri, Molotov, Café Tacuba, Steve Aoki, Eyes Set to Kill, Allison, Delux, Thermo, Insite, Aurum, Here Comes the Kraken, Resorte, and Joliette, among many others.

The album received a positive review from the blog The Vacant Music in December 2013, which rated it 9/10 and described it as "rock, alternative, and some edge," praising the drumming and Montañez's vocals . The same publication had earlier reviewed the single "The Anchor" (featuring Tim Rosales III of I Am Ghost), rating it 10/10 and comparing its rhythms to I Am Ghost while suggesting the band could fit on Warped Tour or Taste of Chaos bills.

Their second full-length album was Brigada Ignis. The Vacant Music reviewed it in September 2014, calling it "straight rock" and highlighting tracks such as "Mafia Romance" and "Uno de Nosotros" . A few months later, Álvarez left the band, and Alejandro Santillan entered as their new permanent lead guitar player. The band was featured on Alternative Press, Exa TV, Telehit, HTV, VH1, The Vacant Music, Blank TV, and Punkeando!'s 20 Best Albums of 2014. For the first time, the video channel VH1 scheduled its latest video, entitled "Lo Que Queda de Ti" leading to more countries around the world. Their music has been downloaded in more than 10 countries around the world, including Germany, India, Spain, Colombia, the United States, Australia, New Zealand, Canada, Hungary, and Peru.

The band released their third full-length studio album, Tiene Que Ser Ahora, worldwide on YouTube, Spotify, and many other digital stores on 28 February 2017, also adding Jerónimo Sarmiento to the permanent band line-up. In June 2018, the band announced their permanent breakup via Facebook due to creative differences.

Omar focused on his solo career as Ace Midas and on his new band Espera A Los Lobos; Jero focused on his main band Enjoy the Last Sunrise, joining Espera A Los Lobos later that year.

Pol formed his new metalcore band Nativo; and the remaining members pursued other personal projects.

On 13 June 2018, Omar released his solo debut full-length album as Ace Midas, Alma Mater, on all music platforms. He released Fantasma Zero as his second in 2021 and Luz, Tiempo, Ruina & Gloria in 2026 as his third and final album.

In August 2019, Omar (Ace Midas) announced a new EP named La Ilusión de Control via his new band Espera A Los Lobos, along with his ex-bandmates Jero Sarmiento and Julio César Álvarez, and new band members Alfredo Villalobos, Iván Bustamante, Eduardo Martínez, and Said Hernández.

In January 2026, Omar (Ace Midas) announced that he was working on two video games: "Odisea Arcadia", a JRPG, and "Dentro Habitan Los Recuerdos Que Nunca Creamos: Una Historia de Odisea Arcadia", a horror game. He is the author of the original story, characters, and all the music for both projects, which are expected to be released soon on Steam, itch.io, and other platforms.

== Style ==
Soy Suspenso's sound is rooted in alternative metal and post-hardcore, built on aggressive guitar riffs, dynamic rhythms, and emotionally charged vocals. On this foundation, they incorporate rap vocal rhythms and electronic textures as accents, while maintaining a modern rock melodic sensibility that gives their heavier sound a degree of accessibility.

== Members ==
=== Current members ===
Omar Montañez – Vocals (2012–2018)

Pol Gómez – Drums (2012–2018)

Alejandro Santillan – Lead Guitar (2014–2018)

Jerónimo Sarmiento - Rhythm Guitar (2017–2018)

Uriel Hernández - Bass (2018)

=== Former members ===
Julio César Álvarez – Lead Guitar (2012–2014)

Alejandro Medina - Bass (2012–2017)

=== Discography ===
2012 – Hotel Venganza

2014 – Brigada Ignis

2017 - Tiene Que Ser Ahora

=== Singles ===
2012- Sin Arrepentimientos

2012- Llamada Anónima

2013- Introducción al Caos

2014- Las Cartas Han Cambiado

2014- Mafia Romance

2014- Lo Que Queda de Ti

2015- Bienvenido al Fin del Mundo

2016- Desde Las Sombras (ft. Luis Rodríguez from Cathleen & Tim Rosales III from I Am Ghost)

2017- Rebelión (ft. Christian Relikia)

2017- El Despertar (ft. Fernando Obregón from Joliette)

2017- Pánico

2017 - Por Siempre
